The 1988 Ebel Swiss Indoors was a men's tennis tournament played on indoor carpet courts at the St. Jakobshalle in Basel, Switzerland that was part of the 1988 Nabisco Grand Prix circuit. It was the 19th edition of the tournament and took place from 4 October until 9 October 1988. First-seeded Stefan Edberg who entered on a wildcard won the singles title.

Finals

Singles
 Stefan Edberg defeated  Jakob Hlasek 7–5, 6–3, 3–6, 6–2
 It was Edberg's 3rd singles title of the year and the 18th of his career.

Doubles
 Jakob Hlasek /  Tomáš Šmíd defeated  Jeremy Bates /  Peter Lundgren 6–3, 6–1

References

External links
 ITF tournament edition profile

Swiss Indoors
Swiss Indoors
1988 in Swiss tennis